Juan Manuel "Mamo" Guillermo Contreras Sepúlveda (4 May 1929 – 7 August 2015) was a Chilean Army officer and the former head of the National Intelligence Directorate (DINA), Chile's secret police during the dictatorship of General Augusto Pinochet. In 1995, he was sentenced to seven years in prison for the murder in Washington, DC, of the Chilean diplomat Dr. Orlando Letelier, which he served until 2001.

At his death, Contreras was serving 59 unappealable sentences totaling 529 years in prison for kidnapping, forced disappearance and assassination.

Early life 
He was the son of Manuel Contreras Morales and Aída Sepúlveda Cubillos, who died when he was six or seven years old. He completed his primary studies at the English Institute of Macul, in Santiago. His father later moved to Osorno, where he entered that city's Lyceum.

Career 
He entered the Military School in 1944, where he graduated with first seniority on 23 December 1947. In 1952, after gaining the rank of lieutenant, Contreras again arrived at the Military School, but this time, he joined the Company of Engineers as an instructor for sappers.

In 1953, he married María Teresa Valdebenito Stevenson. The same year, he arrived at the newly-formed San Antonio School of Engineers.

In 1960, he entered the War Academy to complete the General Staff Officer course. There, he met the Captain Augusto Pinochet, the deputy director of the academy and professor of strategy classes. In Pinochet's classes, much of the time was occupied by his concern of the triumph of the Cuban Revolution.

Contreras graduated from the War Academy in 1962 as a general staff officer. He stood out as the first of his class and obtained the title of academy professor in the subjects of intelligence and logistics. He returned there in 1966 but this time as an intelligence professor.

Under Allende's government 
In 1967, he completed a Postgraduate Course as a General Staff Officer at the School of the Americas, Fort Gulick, Panama Canal Zone. In this place, Contreras learned about the methods of repression used against opposition groups.

When he returned to Chile in 1969 with a major's degree, he taught intelligence classes at the Tejas Verdes School of Engineers. In 1970, he was appointed Secretary of the Army General Staff. In 1971, he was director of the Engineer Regiment No. 4 Arauco in the city of Osorno. It was around then that, together with a group of colonels and captains, he began to collect information and design an intelligence apparatus capable of infiltrating and dismantling leftist organizations. Contreras had a group of informants in Chile from right-wing parties and groups such as the Nationalist Front Fatherland and Liberty (Frente Nacionalista Patria y Libertad, FNPL), at the same time that he maintained contacts with agents of the CIA and the Naval Intelligence Office in Valparaíso and San Antonio who then operated in Chile. The latter provided him with manuals for the secret police of various countries, such as the KCIA of South Korea, the SAVAK of Iran and the National Information Service of Brazil.

A large part of Contreras's concerns was then how to draw up plans to nullify or neutralize the Industrial cordons in which the MIR, the PS, and (to a lesser extent) the MAPU, had strong political influence.

In late 1972, he directed the Tejas Verdes School of Engineers, in addition to teaching at the War Academy.

Operation Condor 

From 1973 to 1977, Contreras led the agency on an international hunt to track down and kill the political opponents of the Junta, particularly members of the Communist and Socialist Parties and the former guerrilla group and political party Movement of the Revolutionary Left (MIR). On 25 November 1975, 
Pinochet's 60th birthday, leaders of the military intelligence services of Argentina, Bolivia, Chile, Paraguay, and Uruguay met with Contreras in Santiago de Chile and officially created the Plan Condor. According to the report "CIA activities in Chile," which was released on September 19, 2000, the US government policy community had approved the CIA's contact with Contreras from 1974 to 1977 to accomplish the CIA's mission in Chile in spite of his role in human rights abuses. By 1975, American intelligence reporting had concluded that Contreras was the principal obstacle to a reasonable human rights policy within the Pinochet government, but the CIA was directed to continue its relationship with Contreras and even gave Contreras a one-time payment in 1975. The CIA became concerned with Contreras's role in the assassination of a former Allende cabinet member and ambassador to Washington, Orlando Letelier, and his American assistant, Ronni Karpen Moffit in Washington, DC, on 21 September 1976. The CIA was said to have gathered specific detailed intelligence reporting alleging Contrera's involvement in ordering the Letelier assassination, but the purported material remains classified and has been withheld at the request of the US Department of Justice (CIA, 2000) CIA contacts with Contreras continued until 1977.

After Orlando Letelier was assassinated, tensions between Contreras and Pinochet grew over the course of his tenure, and the DINA was closed down in 1977 and replaced with a new apparatus, the National Informations Center (CNI).

Contreras, Gerhard Mertins, Sergio Arredondo, and an unidentified Brazilian general traveled to Tehran in 1976 to offer a collaboration to the Shah regime to kill Carlos the Jackal. It is unknown what actually happened in the meetings.

By 1979, Contreras was retired from the army at the rank of general, a rank that he held until his death.

Prison sentences and court investigations 

On 13 November 1993, a Chilean court sentenced Contreras to seven years of prison for the Letelier assassination. He was freed on bail following the conviction, but the Supreme Court of Chile confirmed the sentence on 30 March 1995. Contreras rebelled against the sentence by fleeing to Southern Chile, and then to a military regiment and later a military hospital. After two months, seeing his support from the army vanish, he resigned and was sent to a military prison, where he completed his sentence on 24 January 2001 and was freed.

In May 2002, Contreras was convicted as the mastermind of the 1974 abduction and forced disappearance of the Socialist Party leader Victor Olea Alegria. He received 15 years in prison on 15 April 2003 for the disappearance of the tailor and MIR member Miguel Ángel Sandoval in 1975, but the sentence was reduced on appeal to 12 years. Also in 2003, he was sentenced to 15 years of prison for the 1974 disappearance of journalist Diana Frida Aron Svigilsky. He was amnestied in 2005, but the Supreme Court overturned that decision and confirmed the judgment against Contreras on 30 May 2006. He received another 15-year prison sentence on 18 April 2008 for the disappearance of the political dissident Marcelo Salinas Eytel.

Contreras was also convicted by an Argentine court in connection with the assassination of the former Chilean army chief Carlos Prats and his wife, Sofía Cuthbert in Buenos Aires, in 1974. An extradition request by Argentina was denied by Chile, but on 30 June 2008, a Chilean court gave Contreras two life sentences for the assassination of Prats and his wife, along with a 20-year sentence for conspiracy.

Contreras was sentenced on 23 September 2008 to seven years of prison in connection with the disappearance of the Spanish priest Antonio Llidó Mengual. He was ordered to pay 50 million pesos to compensate for the 1974 abduction of Felix Vargas Fernandez and received another 15 years of prison at a March 2009 sentencing. On 6 July 2012, he received an additional 10 years in prison over the detention and disappearance of the ex-militants José Hipólito Jara Castro and Alfonso Domingo Diaz Briones in 1974. In total, his sentences over the years totaled more than 500 years in prison.

In September 2013, under the orders of President Sebastián Piñera, the luxurious Penal Cordillera, in eastern Santiago, was closed, and Contreras was transferred back to Punta Peuco in Tiltil, north of the capital.

Accusing Pinochet
On 13 May 2005, Contreras submitted to Chile's Supreme Court a 32-page document that claimed to list the whereabouts of about 580 people who disappeared during Pinochet's rule. Human rights groups immediately questioned the information and its source and cited Contreras's years of deception and denials of responsibility for human rights abuses. Many of the details he provided were previously known, and some contradicted the findings of commissions that have investigated the disappearances. In the document, he wrote that Pinochet had personally ordered the repressive measures. During the same May 2005 hearing to the Supreme Court, Contreras directly accused the CIA and the Cuban terrorist Luis Posada Carriles in the 1976 assassination of Orlando Letelier.

Contreras accused Pinochet of having given the order to assassinate Orlando Letelier and Carlos Prats. He also declared to Chilean justice in 2005 that the CNI, the successor of DINA, handed out monthly payments between 1978 and 1990 to the persons who had worked with DINA agent Michael Townley in Chile, all members of Patria y Libertad, the far-right movement that had been involved in the Tanquetazo : Mariana Callejas (Townley's wife), Francisco Oyarzún, Gustavo Etchepare and Eugenio Berríos. Assassinated in 1995, Berríos, who worked as a chemist for the DINA in Colonia Dignidad, also worked with drug traffickers and DEA agents.

Pinochet died at the age of 91 on 10 December 2006, before any court could convict the former dictator of crimes related to his military rule.

Illness and death

During his last years, Contreras underwent dialysis three times a week at Santiago's Military Hospital. On 25 August 2014, he remained hospitalized there for kidney problems. With his condition worsening, he was eventually transferred to the intensive care unit. He died on 7 August 2015 at the hospital. The exact cause of death was not given by the hospital authorities. The announcement of his death was greeted by a demonstration of several dozen people in front of the hospital, who shouted "Murderer!" and toasted his death with champagne. There were also celebrations by hundreds of people at Plaza Italia, a square in Downtown Santiago.

References

External links
 Juan Manuel Guillermo CONTRERAS SEPULVEDA, Trial Watch Profile, TRIAL
 A list of Supreme Court sentences involving Manuel Contreras , Law Faculty, Diego Portales University.

1929 births
2015 deaths
Chilean Army generals
Chilean assassins
Chilean people of Spanish descent
Chilean anti-communists
Dirty wars
People of the Dirección de Inteligencia Nacional
Chilean people convicted of crimes against humanity
People convicted of kidnapping
People from Santiago
Chilean people who died in prison custody
Prisoners who died in Chilean detention